Lophiotoma acuta, commonly known as the marbled turrid, is a species of sea snail, a marine gastropod mollusk in the family Turridae, the turrids.

Description
The length of an adult shell varies between 30 mm and 90 mm.

The narrow, fusiform shell has a high, acute spire and is less carinated and has more rounded revolving ribs than other species in this genus. The shell contains 13 whorls of which three in the protoconch. The convex whorls are transversely sulcated. They are obscurely grained and ornamented round the upper half with a double zone or belt. The long siphonal canal is slightly reclined to the left.  The shallow sutures are characterized by large spots and smaller ones elsewhere, coalescing into longitudinal, undulated streaks.

Distribution
This marine species occurs in the Red Sea, in the Indian Ocean, and in the Indo-West Pacific along with the Philippines, Vanuatu, Japan and Hong Kong.

References

 Drivas, J.; Jay, M. (1987). Coquillages de La Réunion et de l'Île Maurice. Collection Les Beautés de la Nature. Delachaux et Niestlé: Neuchâtel. . 159 pp.
 Steyn, D.G & Lussi, M. (2005). Offshore Shells of Southern Africa: A pictorial guide to more than 750 Gastropods. Published by the authors. Pp. i–vi, 1–289
A quest for the lost types of Lophiotoma (Gastropoda: Conoidea: Turridae): integrative taxonomy in a nomenclatural mess. Zoological Journal of the Linnean Society 181: 243-271

External links
 Perry, G. (1811). Conchology, or the natural history of shells: containing a new arrangement of the genera and species, illustrated by coloured engravings executed from the natural specimens, and including the latest discoveries. 4 pp., 61 plates. London
 Puillandre N., Fedosov A.E., Zaharias P., Aznar-Cormano L. & Kantor Y.I. (2017). A quest for the lost types of Lophiotoma (Gastropoda: Conoidea: Turridae): integrative taxonomy in a nomenclatural mess. Zoological Journal of the Linnean Society. 181: 243-271

acuta
Gastropods described in 1811